Davus, also known as the tiger rump tarantulas, is a genus of spiders in the family Theraphosidae (tarantulas). It was formerly included in Cyclosternum. They are medium to large tarantulas, found in Central America and Mexico.

Diagnosis 
They are characterized by the opisthosomal pattern which are made of several red-orange stripes. Though further identification between species is decided mainly on the palpal bulb and spermatheca morphology. As Davus pentaloris owns a high variations of size, patterning and morphology.

Species
, the World Spider Catalog accepted the following species:
Davus fasciatus O. Pickard-Cambridge, 1892 (type species) – Costa Rica, Panama
Davus pentaloris (Simon, 1888) – Mexico, Guatemala
Davus ruficeps (Simon, 1891) – Mexico, Guatemala, El Salvador, Honduras
Davus santos Gabriel, 2016 – Panama

In synonymy 

 Davus drymusetes (Valerio, 1982) = Davus fasciatus
 Davus morosum (Banks, 1909) = Davus ruficeps
 Davus mozinno Estrada-Alvarez, 2014 = Davus pentaloris
 Davus zebratum (Banks, 1909) = Davus ruficeps

References

Theraphosidae
Theraphosidae genera
Spiders of Mexico
Spiders of Central America